Vincent Harvey (1937 – 1 November 2022) was an Irish Gaelic footballer and manager. He played with club side Éire Óg and at inter-county level with the Carlow senior football team. Harvey also served as manager of a range of club teams.

Playing career
Harvey was a founder-member of the Éire Óg club in Carlow in 1956. He enjoyed his first success at adult level when Éire Óg won the Carlow JFC title in 1958. The following decade saw Harvey win Carlow SFC titles with the club in 1960, 1962, 1965, 1967 and 1968. His performances at club level earned a call-up to the Carlow senior football team and he made a number of appearances for the team in the National League and Leinster Championship.

Management career
After his playing days, Harvey managed a number of club teams in Carlow, Wicklow, Kildare, Laois and Wexford. He brought various championship successes to Kiltegan, Ballymanus, Tinahely, Coolboy and Knockananna. Harvey was also manager of the Carlow under-21 team that reached the Leinster final in 1984.

Personal life and death
In his working life, Harvey started his working life as a telegram boy with Carlow Post Office, graduating to postman for the Carlow area. He later took up a position as rate and revenue collector with Carlow County Council.

Harvey died on 1 November 2022, at the age of 85.

Honours

Player
Éire Óg
Carlow Senior Football Championship: 1960, 1962, 1965, 1967, 1968

Management
Kiltegan
Wicklow Intermediate Football Championship: 1975
Wicklow Junior A Football Championship: 1975

Ballymanus
Wicklow Intermediate Football Championship: 1986
Wicklow Junior A Football Championship: 1980

Tinahely
Wicklow Senior Football Championship: 1984

Coolboy
Wicklow Junior A Football Championship: 1985

Knockananna
Wicklow Junior A Football Championship: 1989
Wicklow Junior B Football Championship: 1987

References

1937 births
2022 deaths
Carlow inter-county Gaelic footballers
Éire Óg (Carlow) Gaelic footballers
Gaelic football managers
Gaelic football selectors
Irish postmen